Will C. Wood High School is a high school in the Vacaville Unified School District located in Vacaville, California, serving the south side of the city and the unincorporated community of Elmira. First opening its doors in September 1969, it was a middle school until the 1988–1989 school year. That was when the conversion to a high school began and had its first graduating class in 1992. The school has seen two major improvement projects, based on funding from Measure V passed in 2003, improving physical education facilities and adding the science wing, and Measure A passed in 2014, which finally gave Will C. Wood their own stadium.

School history 
Will C. Wood first opened its doors in September 1969.  At that time it was planned to be Vacaville's second comprehensive high school.  Growth was not as fast as anticipated and plans were modified.  From 1969 to 1973 Will C. Wood was a satellite campus for Vacaville High School.  Ninth and tenth grades for science and math and all classes for ninth graders were two combinations that were used.  In the fall of 1974, Wood became a junior high school (grades 7 - 9) servicing the south side of Vacaville while Willis Jepson Junior High School serviced the north side of Vacaville.  Wood remained in this format until the 1988–1989 school year.

A new intermediate school, Vaca Pena Intermediate School, was built on the south side of Vacaville.  Seventh graders went to Vaca Pena rather than to Wood.  In 1988 Wood began its transition into a four-year high school.  That year Wood had 8th, 9th, and 10th graders.  Construction was started to complete Wood as a high school.  A new gymnasium, locker room, classroom wing, office complex, cafeteria, and theater were added.  Each year a new class was added.  The 1991–1992 school year was the first year that Will C. Wood was a complete four year high school.  However, the facility was never completed. The class of 1992 was its first graduating class.  In 2012 Will C Wood celebrated its first 20 years of graduates.

Principals

Notable alumni
 Carson Strong (Class of 2018, quarterback for the Nevada Wolf Pack)

 Jarrett Bush (Class of 2002, Super Bowl XLV Champion with the Green Bay Packers)

 Jermaine Dye (Class of 1992, 2005 World Series MVP with the Chicago White Sox)

References

Public high schools in California
High schools in Solano County, California
Vacaville, California
1969 establishments in California
Educational institutions established in 1969